The 2010 Magyar Kupa, known as  for sponsorship reasons, is the 84th edition of the tournament.

Quarter-finals

Quarter-final matches were played on 16 and 17 October 2010.

|}

Final four
The final four will be held on 20 and 21 November 2010 at the Szőnyi úti uszoda in Budapest.

Semi-finals

Final

See also
 2010–11 Országos Bajnokság I

External links
 Hungarian Water Polo Federaration 

Seasons in Hungarian water polo competitions
Hungary
Magyar Kupa